Jesse Huta Galung was the defending champion, but he lost to Albert Ramos-Viñolas in the first round.
The new champion became other Dutch - Robin Haase, who won in the final 7–5, 6–3, against Matteo Trevisan.

Seeds

Draw

Finals

Top half

Bottom half

External links
 Main Draw
 Qualifying Draw

Citta di Caltanissetta - Singles
Città di Caltanissetta